The Hageman Farm is a historic house located at 209 South Middlebush Road in Somerset, New Jersey. It is a registered historic place of New Jersey.

Hageman family
The progenitors of the Hageman family were Catherine and Adrian Hegeman, who emigrated from the Netherlands around 1650 or 1651. They first settled in Flatbush, New York, then in 1702, four grandsons of Adrian and Catherine moved to Six Mile Run, New Jersey.

Benjamin B. Hageman
Adrian's great-grandson was Benjamin B. Hageman (1812–1890). In 1845, Benjamin married Jane Van Wickle (1823–1901), and they moved to Somerville, New Jersey and farmed there for the next sixteen years. Jane Van Wickle was a descendant of Symen Van Wickle. In 1861, Benjamin moved to the Garretson-Hageman farm, and in 1868, he renovated and expanded the existing house. Benjamin had two sons: Samuel Hageman (c1845-1876); and Garretson Hageman (1846–1915).

Garretson Hageman
Garretson Hageman was the next owner of the house. He graduated from Rutgers College in 1868, and he became the area's land surveyor, civil engineer, and notary.  He married Caroline Gano Staats had FOUR children: Jane Ann Van Wickle Hageman (1888–1978) who married Frederick Locke Bascom (1887-?); Peter Hageman, Magdeline Gano Hageman who married Tunis Davis(1890-1965) and Benjamin Hegeman.

Peter Hageman
The house passed to Peter Hageman (c1890-1943) in 1933, after the death of his grandmother. Peter was the Franklin Township Tax Collector from 1928 until his death in 1943; his wife assumed his duties, continuing for another 24 years from the house. For nearly 40 years, the large room off the south porch served as the Tax Collector's office. Peter's son, Garretson Hageman continued to live on the farm with his family until 1972, when the land was condemned for the proposed Six Mile Run Reservoir.

Meadows Foundation
The Hageman Farm remained deserted for over five years, damaged by weather, neglect and vandalism. Abandonment of the Six-Mile Run Reservoir allowed the house to avoid being demolished. On July 13, 1978, the Franklin Township, Somerset County, New Jersey authorizing the purchase of the farm and out-buildings for $100 by the Meadows Foundation. The annual lease of the surrounding  to be returned to the Township in lieu of taxes.

References

External links
Map: 

Franklin Township, Somerset County, New Jersey
Meadows Foundation (New Jersey)
Farms in New Jersey
Houses in Somerset County, New Jersey
Historic house museums in New Jersey
Museums in Somerset County, New Jersey